Botrychium montanum is a species of fern in the family Ophioglossaceae known by the common names western goblin and mountain moonwort. It is native to western North America from British Columbia to northern California to Montana, where it grows in the dark understory of coniferous forests and other moist wooded areas. This is very small plant growing from an underground caudex and sending one thin gray-green leaf above the surface of the ground. The leaf is less than 8 centimeters tall and is divided into a sterile and a fertile part. The sterile part of the leaf has irregularly shaped angled leaflets. The fertile part of the leaf is very different in shape, with grapelike clusters of sporangia by which it reproduces.

References

External links
USDA Plants Profile for Botrychium montanum (mountain moonwort)
Jepson Manual eFlora (TJM2) treatment of Botrychium montanum
Calflora Database: Botrychium montanum (mountain moonwort)
Flora of North America
UC CalPhotos gallery of Botrychium montanum  (Mountain moonwort)

montanum
Ferns of California
Ferns of Canada
Ferns of the United States
Flora of British Columbia
Flora of Idaho
Flora of Oregon
Flora of Washington (state)
Flora of the Cascade Range
Critically endangered flora of California
Plants described in 1981